Just Roll with It is an American family comedy television series created by Adam Small and Trevor Moore that aired on Disney Channel from June 14, 2019 to May 14, 2021. The series stars Ramon Reed, Kaylin Hayman, Suzi Barrett, Tobie Windham, and JC Currais.

Premise 
The Bennett-Blatt family do not have much in common with each other as they go through their everyday lives in Akron, Ohio. When a foghorn is heard, the actors break character in order to have a live studio audience decide what happens next. From there, the audience gets to vote on what happens to the family, and they are presented with three choices during certain scenes. If there is a tie between two options, both of them will take place. No matter what happens, they'll have to "just roll with it", as said by the actors.

Cast and characters

Main 
 Ramon Reed as Owen Blatt, a model student who skipped a grade; likes to follow rules and schedules; Byron's son, Rachel's stepson, and Blair's stepbrother
 Kaylin Hayman as Blair Bennett, a rebellious preteen; Rachel's daughter, Byron's stepdaughter, and Owen's stepsister
 Suzi Barrett as Rachel Bennett-Blatt, a decorated military veteran and the general manager at BEATZ 101; Blair's mother, Owen's stepmother, and Byron's wife
 Tobie Windham as Byron Blatt, an on-air radio personality at BEATZ 101; Owen's father, Blair's stepfather, and Rachel's husband
 JC Currais as The Gator (recurring, season 1; main, season 2), Byron's man-child co-host at BEATZ 101 who also owns a karate dojo, lives in a boat on his mom's property, and has strange habits

Recurring 
 Lela Brown as DJ Lela B, a kindhearted rapping DJ that works near the studio audience
 Michael Lanahan as Mr. Penworth, Owen and Blair's teacher
 Candace Kozak as Ruth, Blair's best friend who is also Owen's friend
 John Ratzenberger as George Bennett, Rachel's father and Blair's grandfather who moves in with them after getting kicked out of his retirement home; he later marries Nana Blatt.

Notable guest stars 
 John Michael Higgins as Caleb Barnswallow, a former army friend of Rachel's who Blair dislikes
 Raven-Symoné as Betsy Hagg, a self-proclaimed vampire
 Miranda May as Mrs. Polapamus
 Jason Earles as Skeeter Swindell

Production 
On October 24, 2018, Disney Channel announced that it had ordered multi-camera family comedy series Just Roll with It, a hybrid television series with a mix of scripted and improvisational scenes. Adam Small and Trevor Moore serve as executive producers. The series is a production of Kenwood TV Productions. The series was expected to premiere in summer 2019. On April 26, 2019, it was announced that the series would have a special preview on June 14, 2019, before its official premiere on June 19, 2019. On August 28, 2019, it was announced that there would be a special interactive telecast on October 4, 2019. Issac Ryan Brown, Ruby Rose Turner, and Ruth Righi host the special, which includes a musical performance, with Raven-Symoné and Miranda May as guest stars. On September 10, 2019, it was announced that Disney Channel renewed the series for a second season and entered an overall development deal with the series' creators. Production of the second season began in September 2019. On December 6, 2021, it was reported that the second season was the last season of the series.

Episodes

Series overview

Season 1 (2019–20)

Season 2 (2020–21)

Ratings 
 

| link2             = #Season 2 (2020–21)
| episodes2         = 21
| start2            = 
| end2              = 
| startrating2      = 0.36
| endrating2        = 0.27
| viewers2          = |2}} 
}}

References

External links 
 

2010s American children's comedy television series
2020s American children's comedy television series
2019 American television series debuts
2021 American television series endings
Disney Channel original programming
English-language television shows
Improvisational television series